Dmytro Chernysh is the name of two Ukrainian football players:

Dmytro Chernysh (footballer, born 1998), Ukrainian football goalkeeper
Dmytro Chernysh (footballer, born 2004), Ukrainian football midfielder